The 1976 LPGA Championship was the 22nd LPGA Championship, held May 27–30 at Pine Ridge Golf Course in Lutherville, Maryland, a suburb north of Baltimore.

Betty Burfeindt won her only major title, a stroke ahead of runner-up Judy Rankin. It was her fourth and final win on the LPGA Tour.

Past champions in the field

Source:

Final leaderboard
Sunday, May 30, 1976

Source:

References

External links
Golf Observer leaderboard
Pine Ridge Golf Course

Women's PGA Championship
Golf in Maryland
LPGA Championship
LPGA Championship
LPGA Championship
LPGA Championship
Women's sports in Maryland